The King of Sidon was the ruler of Sidon, an ancient Phoenician city in what is now Lebanon.

Scholars have pieced together the fragmented list from various archaeological finds since the 19th century.

Egyptian period
 c.1700s BC Zimrida
 c. 1300s BC Zimredda of Sidon / Zimrida II
 c. 1300s BC Iab-nilud

Assyrian period
 680–677 BC Abdi-Milkutti

Persian period

Eshmunazar Dynasty
  575–550 BC Eshmunazar I
  549–539 BC Tabnit I
  539–525 BC  Eshmunazar II; Amoashtart (Amastoreth, interregnum until Eshmunazar's majority)
  525–515 BC Bodashtart
  515–486 BC Yatonmilk
 486–480 BC Anysos
  480–479 BC Tetramnestos.

Baalshillem Dynasty
 450–426 BC Baalshillem I
 425–? BC Abdamon
 ?–401 BC Baana
 401–366 BC Baalshillem II (Sakton)
 365–352 BC Abdashtart I
 351–347 BC Tennes (Tabnit II)
 346–343 BC Evagoras II (?)
 342–333 BC Abdashtart II

Hellenic period
 332–329 BC Abdalonymus
 Philocles, King of Sidon

See also
King of Tyre
King of Byblos

References

Sidon
 
Heads of state of Lebanon